Cristian Fabrício Gomes Machado (born 22 August 1994), commonly known as Cristian, Cristian Machado or Cristian Gomes, is a Brazilian footballer who currently plays as a midfielder for Gangneung Citizen FC.

Career statistics

Club

Notes

References

1994 births
Living people
Brazilian footballers
Brazilian expatriate footballers
Association football midfielders
Uruguayan Primera División players
Liga Portugal 2 players
Cerro Largo F.C. players
Sportivo Cerrito players
Guarany Futebol Clube players
Uberaba Sport Club players
F.C. Penafiel players
Brazilian expatriate sportspeople in Uruguay
Expatriate footballers in Uruguay
Brazilian expatriate sportspeople in Portugal
Expatriate footballers in Portugal